C. kermadecensis may refer to:
 Calliphora kermadecensis, a synonym for Calliphora hilli, a fly species
 Conus kermadecensis, a synonym for Conus lischkeanus, a sea snail species
 Cyathea kermadecensis, a tree fern species endemic to Raoul Island in the Kermadec Islands